Jipijapa may refer to:
 The Jipijapa palm, a palm tree
 Jipijapa, another name for the Panama hat, traditionally woven from the leaves of that tree

Jipijapa as a place name:
 Jipijapa, Ecuador, a town in Ecuador
 Jipijapa Canton, in which the town is located
 Jipijapa metro station, a Quito Metro station